Malakwal–Khushab branch line is one of several branch lines in Pakistan, operated and maintained by Pakistan Railways. The line begins from Malakwal Junction station and ends at Khushab Junction station. There are 14 railway stations from Malakwal Junction to Khushab Junction. At present, rail traffic on this line is suspended.

History

The Malakwal–Khushab branch line was built as part of the Sind–Sagar Railway between 1884 and 1939. The line was conceived to haul freight from the mining rich region and served two important smaller railways: the Gharibwal Cement Works Railway and the Dandot Light Railway (serving the Khewra Salt Mine). In 1939, the Victoria bridge had to be completely re-girdered on the old piers when the bridge proved to be incapable of taking increased rail traffic.

Dandot Light Railway

The Dandot Light Railway opened in 1905 as a   narrow gauge railway from Dandot railway station to Chalisa Junction railway station. It was built to serve the Khewra Salt Mine.

Gharibwal Cement Works Railway
The Gharibwal Cement Works Railway opened in May 1886 as a   railway from Haranpur Junction to Gharibwal. It was built to serve the Gharibwal quarry.

Stations
 Malakwal Junction
 Chak Nizam
 Haranpur Junction > to Gharibwal
 Chalisa Junction > to Dandot Light Railway
 Pind Dadan Khan
 Golpur
 Saroba
 Tobah
 Lilla
 Lilla Town
 Kandwal Halt
 Dhak Janjua
 Rakh Rajar
 Khushab Junction

References

Railway stations on Malakwal–Khushab branch line
5 ft 6 in gauge railways in Pakistan